Makoto Takagaki (born 24 December 1973) is a Japanese snowboarder. He competed in the men's halfpipe event at the 1998 Winter Olympics.

References

1973 births
Living people
Japanese male snowboarders
Olympic snowboarders of Japan
Snowboarders at the 1998 Winter Olympics
Sportspeople from Hokkaido
20th-century Japanese people